Santo Tomás Ocotepec  is a town and municipality in Oaxaca in south-western Mexico. The municipality covers an area of  km². 
It is part of the Tlaxiaco District in the south of the Mixteca Region.

References

Municipalities of Oaxaca